Samuel James Supalla (December 4, 1957) is an American Sign Language performer, filmmaker, and linguist.

Supalla was born in Pasco, Washington in December 1957. On his birth he has said, "Although, I really think of myself as being born around December 23rd with the help of my brother, Ted!" Ted had helped with the creation of his name sign, which Samuel did not have until three weeks after his birth. At a very young age, he began appointing name signs for others. Both of his parents were deaf and he had three brothers, two deaf and one hard of hearing. Supalla is notable for his storytelling performances in American Sign Language (ASL), particularly for his narrative in The American Literature Series: For a Decent Living. He is a filmmaker and a linguist “whose interest lies in the research and English development issues concerning deaf children” and stresses the importance of a natural sign language.

Early life
Before enrolling in school, Samuel's father would often go to the Deaf Club bringing the whole family along to attend. Samuel himself remembers the old stories and plays that were performed in ASL. The audience at the Club shared a fascination for these ASL stories. He graduated from the Oregon School for the Deaf. Throughout preschool and elementary, the program enforced oralism amongst deaf students where signing was not allowed. Although the children were not allowed to sign, they would do so in their dormitories. “I had become a signing model for my peers during the early formative years. When Supalla went home, he made up stories about an imaginary white horse, and when he returned to school, he told his classmates. When the students visited his home, “they would ask where the white horse was. I would have to lie and tell them that the white horse died. They were disappointed that they never got to see the white horse”.

Talent competition
When Supalla was 15, the Oregon School for the Deaf was invited by Gallaudet University to go to National Association of the Deaf. There was a talent competition in front of an audience of Gallaudet students. Supalla won the competition.

College years
At the end of high school, Supalla enrolled at California State University Northridge in 1976 and graduated as a History major. During his college years, he was invited to a conference on American Sign Language research, as a part of the entertainment for the conference. It was this engagement that established the start of his professional career. During this period of his life, he travelled for the purpose of doing live shows/storytelling in front of many audiences. He worked as a research assistant at the Salk Institute for Biological Studies. His next move was to apply to the University of Illinois at Urbana-Champaign in 1982, where he was admitted and majored in education with a concentration in bilingual education. It was at the University of Illinois that he received his master's degree and Doctorate degrees.

Career
After graduating from the University of Illinois, Supalla was offered a job at the University of Arizona. He took the job and moved to Tucson, Arizona, in 1989. His prime focus at the university is on disability and psychoeducational studies.

“His original work on how artificial English-based sign systems fail has led to a greater appreciation of American Sign Language (ASL) as a working language in terms of visual perception and processing.”  

Supalla is concerned with literacy issues regarding learning to read and write in English. “In the case of deaf children, the need to develop a 'mother tongue' (e.g., ASL) is stressed in order to facilitate the learning of a second language (e.g., English) within the context of bilingualism.” 

Supalla's The Book Of Names Signs was published 1992. It describes the origins of American Sign Language name signing.

ASL-phabet is a system designed by Supalla. It is the American Sign Language dictionary for kids which consists of over 300 sign words that include symbols such as Handshape, Location, and Movement. It is a “primary source of English for deaf learners“.

Supalla contributed to A Free Hand: Enfranchising the Education of Deaf Children. His part discusses “the policy analysis on the notion of reverse mainstreaming and the redefinition of bilingual education for deaf children that is forthcoming.”

References 

1957 births
Living people
Deaf writers
People from Pasco, Washington
American deaf people
Linguists of sign languages